Sturgeon Falls was a provincial electoral district in the Canadian province of Ontario, active from 1908 to 1934. The district was created when the former district of Nipissing West was divided into Sturgeon Falls and Sudbury for the 1908 election.

Members of Provincial Parliament

References

Former provincial electoral districts of Ontario